The 1990 Venda coup d'état was a bloodless military coup in Venda, an unrecognised state and a nominally independent South African homeland for the Venda people, which took place on 5 April 1990. The coup was led by the then 48-year-old Colonel Gabriel Ramushwana, the Chief of Staff of the Venda Defence Force, against the government of President Frank Ravele (NPV).

Ramushwana's military government stayed in power until January 1994, several months before the reunification of Venda with South Africa after the first post-apartheid general election.

See also 
 1987 Transkei coup d'état
 1990 Ciskei coup d'état
 1994 Bophuthatswana crisis

References 

Military coups in Venda
Politics of Venda
1990 in South Africa
April 1990 events in Africa
1990s coups d'état and coup attempts